Giovanni Naboth (born 26 August 1976) is a Mauritian footballer who currently plays as a defender for Petite Rivière Noire SC. He won 10 caps for the Mauritius national football team between 2002 and 2006.

References

1976 births
Living people
Mauritian footballers
Mauritius international footballers
Mauritian Premier League players
Petite Rivière Noire FC players
Savanne SC players

Association football defenders